Servaville-Salmonville is a commune in the Seine-Maritime department in the Normandy region in northern France.

Geography
The N31 road forms the commune's southern border.

Population

Places of interest
 The church of St. Clement, dating from the thirteenth century.
 A seventeenth-century stone cross.
 The eighteenth-century manorhouse of Hémaudière.

See also
Communes of the Seine-Maritime department

References

Communes of Seine-Maritime